The Norwalk Green Historic District is a historic district in the Central Norwalk section of Norwalk, Connecticut. The district is centered on the Norwalk Green, a common area until 1851 that is now a park owned by Norwalk's First Taxing District. It includes St. Paul's Episcopal Church and the First Congregational Church, both of which face the green. The district contains 54 contributing buildings, 3 contributing sites (the Green, Mill Hill Historic Park, and St. Paul's Place), and 1 other contributing object (World War I memorial on the Green), most of which were designed in the 18th and 19th centuries. The district is irregular in shape, drawn to include historic properties in the vicinity of the Norwalk Green, but to exclude non-historic properties.

The district was listed on the National Register of Historic Places in 1987.

See also
National Register of Historic Places listings in Fairfield County, Connecticut

References

Federal architecture in Connecticut
Geography of Norwalk, Connecticut
Historic districts in Fairfield County, Connecticut
New England town greens
National Register of Historic Places in Fairfield County, Connecticut
Historic districts on the National Register of Historic Places in Connecticut